Frederick David Le Deux (born 4 December 1934) is a former Australian rules footballer who played with Geelong in the Victorian Football League (VFL). He is the grandfather of Tom Hawkins.

Early life
Le Deux grew up in Nagambie and attended Assumption College, after which he went to Bendigo to study teaching.

Football
While a student at Bendigo Teachers' Training College, Le Deux played for the Sandhurst Football Club. He then moved to Ocean Grove to take up a teaching position and in 1956 joined Geelong.

A follower and defender, Le Deux made 18 appearances for Geelong over three seasons, from 1956 to 1958 He was troubled by a back injury in 1958, which kept him out of the entire 1959 VFL season.

In 1960 he joined Victorian Football Association club Mordialloc, as he had transferred to a local technical school.

Family
Le Deux's daughter Jennifer was married to former Geelong player Jack Hawkins. Jennifer died in 2015. Their son, Tom Hawkins, currently plays for Geelong.

References

External links

1934 births
Living people
Australian rules footballers from Victoria (Australia)
Geelong Football Club players
Sandhurst Football Club players
Mordialloc Football Club players